Krishna University (KrU) is a state university located in Rudravaram, Machilipatnam, Andhra Pradesh, India. The university was established in 2008 by the Government of Andhra Pradesh.

It provides degree courses like Bachelor of Science, Bachelor of Commerce, Bachelor of Arts and professional courses like Bachelor of Engineering in Computer Science & Electronics and Communication engineering.
 The university offers Pharmacy courses like B.pharmacy and M.pharmacy, It also consists of Master courses like Master of Technology, Master of Arts, Master of Science courses.

Colleges
It has the following constituent colleges:
KrU College of Arts and Science
KrU Dr. MRAR College of Post Graduation Studies
KrU College of Engineering and Technology
KrU College of Pharmaceutical Sciences and Research

See also
 List of universities in India
 Education in India

References

External links
Krishna University Website

Universities and colleges in Krishna district
Educational institutions established in 2008
2008 establishments in Andhra Pradesh
State universities in Andhra Pradesh